Manuel Johnson (born 1986) is an American football player.

Manuel Johnson may also refer to:
Manuel H. Johnson, American economist 
Manuel John Johnson (1805–1859), British astronomer